Giafferi is a surname. Notable people with the surname include:

Luiggi Giafferi (1668–1748), Prime Minister of the Kingdom of Corsica
Vincent de Moro-Giafferi (1878–1956), French criminal attorney

Italian-language surnames